Juana Marta Rodas (February 8, 1925 – August 8, 2013) was a Paraguayan ceramist.

Biography 
Rodas was born on February 8, 1925, in Itá in the Central Department, a city that is nicknamed the Capital of Ceramics. She died on August 8, 2013.

She was educated in ceramic art by her mother Juana de Jesús Oviedo and grandmother María Balbina Cuevas. Herself, she passed her knowledge to her daughter with whom she worked together great part of her career and who became a known ceramist herself too, Julia Isídrez. Together they held exhibitions internationally and received many international awards.

Rodas' work should be classified as modern art, and is characterized by traditional pottery of the countryside with exotic Jesuit and contemporary techniques. Josefina Pla characterized her work as "micro-sculptures" in her book La cerámica popular Paraguaya.

Art critic and academic Ticio Escobar comprises their art as follows: "one of the most strong and original testimonies of contemporary Paraguayan art, and a tribute to its noble history". Her work can be found in private collections, cultural centers and museums in Paraguay and abroad.

Expositions 
The art of Rodas and Isídrez was shown on many expositions in Paraguay and abroad. Here follows a selection:
1976. Gallery van the UNESCO, Paris
1992 and 1993: Gallery Fábrica, Asunción
1994: Salon of the Biennale Martel, Cultural City Center, Asunción
1995: Gallery Lamarca, Asunción
1995: Center of Visual Arts, Museo del Barro, Asunción
1996: Gallery Fábrica, Asunción
1997: Gallery Lamarca, Asunción
1998 and 1999: Center of Visual Arts, Museo del Barro, Asunción
1999: Biennale of the Mercosur, Porto Alegre
2007: 16th international year fair ARte COntemporáneo (ARCO), Madrid
2008: 35th international exhibition of traditional art, Pontifical Catholic University of Chile, Santiago
2009: Museum of Contemporary Crafts Art of Chile, Santiago

Awards 
Rodas received many awards, greatly together with her daughter Julia Isídrez:
1994: Grand Prize, Biennale of Martel for Visual Arts, Cultural City Center, Asunción
1998: Prize of the city of Madrid
1999: Prince Claus Award
1999: Award for Best Craft Artist of the UNESCO, the Central Department and the society Hecho à Mano
2001: First Prize in Traditional Art, Cooperativa Universitaria
2008: Lorenzo Berg Salvo Prize, Pontifical Catholic University of Chile, Santiago
2009: Grand Cross of the National Order of Merit, France

References 

1925 births
2013 deaths
Paraguayan ceramists
People from Itá, Paraguay
People from Central Department